Viscumamide is a cyclic peptide isolated from endophytic fungi of mangrove.

References

Cyclic peptides